A consortium of researchers in Bangladesh has successfully decoded the jute plant draft genome sequencing. The consortium consisted of Dhaka University, Bangladesh Jute Research Institute and software company DataSoft Systems Bangladesh Ltd. in collaboration with Centre for Chemical Biology, University of Science Malaysia and University of Hawaii at Manoa, US. On June 16, 2010, Bangladeshi Prime Minister Sheikh Hasina had disclosed in the parliament that Bangladeshi researchers had successfully done draft jute genome sequencing which will contribute to improving jute fibre. Bangladesh is the second country after Malaysia among the developing nations in this kind of achievement.

History
It all began in February 2008, when Maqsudul Alam approached Professor Ahmad Shamsul Islam, Coordinator of GNOBB (Global Network of Bangladeshi Biotechnologists) regarding the possibility of sequencing the jute genome. The Bangladeshi science community, which was already looking into the possibility of getting the jute genome sequenced, responded to this offer, which started the process. The whole process began with many long conference calls between Dr. Alam and plant molecular biologists, Professors Haseena Khan and Zeba Islam Seraj of the Department of Biochemistry and Molecular Biology, University of Dhaka. They established connection with University of Hawaii, USA and University of Science Malaysia for technical support and prepared a project proposal to collect fund from different institutions. At the beginning there were many assurance but the reality was different. In the primary stage Genome Research Center USA and University of Science Malaysia gave some technical help to collect research data about jute from all over the world. To analyze huge amount of data there arose a need for a super computer. There was still need of funding for field research. "Swapnajatra" team become frustrated by not getting proper support. It became difficult to keep engage the team members. In 2009, The Daily Prothom Alo published an article about the research that changed everything. Agriculture Minister Matia Chowdhury introduced Dr. Maqsudul Alam to prime minister Sheikh Hasina and assured about further support. Thus team "Swapnajatra" regained their confidence and continued their work.

Resources
Genomic DNA (gDNA) from Tossa Jute (Corchorus olitorius O-4) was used for high-throughput Next Generation Sequencing (NGS) platforms, including 454 GS FLX, Illumina/Solexa, and SOLiD. More than 50X coverage (over 100 billions of A, C, G, and Ts) of Jute genome-sequencing data were used for the draft assembly. Several open-source and commercial genome assembly and annotation pipelines were used to assemble and analyze the raw data. To validate the draft genome, transcriptome analysis was also carried out. For data analysis, different computational resources, ranging from a high-performance Cluster Server to Dell servers to Silicon Graphics SGI Altix-350 and 450, were used.

See also
Genome project
Structural genomics

References

External links
 Jute genome Homepage

Genome projects
Jute